John Commins may refer to:

 John Commins (cricketer, born 1941) (1941–2013), South African cricketer
 John Commins (cricketer, born 1965) (born 1965), former South African cricketer
 John Commins (hurler) (born 1966), former Irish hurler

See also
John Cummins (disambiguation)
John Cummings (disambiguation)